Gerhard Hartmann (born January 12, 1955) is a retired long-distance runner from Austria, who won the Vienna Marathon three times in a row, starting in 1985. He represented his native country in the men's marathon at the 1984 Summer Olympics in Los Angeles, California. Hartmann set his personal best (2:12:22) on April 13, 1986, winning his second title in Vienna.

Achievements

References

1955 births
Living people
Austrian male long-distance runners
Austrian male marathon runners
Athletes (track and field) at the 1984 Summer Olympics
Olympic athletes of Austria